"The Unknown Painter", subtitled "A Story of Murillo's Pupil", is a short story by an anonymous author that has been falsely claimed to contain the first English-language use of the word 'zombi(e)'.  (Zombie was spelled without an 'e' until the 1900s). The story, which is a fable about Murillo's pupil Sebastián Gómez, was originally printed in Chambers's Edinburgh Journal in the 1830s. It was reprinted in 1838 in the  Alton Telegraph, and subsequently reprinted, with changes, multiple times in American newspapers.

In fact the original version of the story did not include the word 'zombi', which seems to have been added in the text and the title in later American reprints. The actual first use of the word "zombi" in English, as recorded in the Oxford English Dictionary, was in 1819, prior to the publication of the story.

References 

1830s short stories
Works published anonymously